Michael Riley (July 19, 1874 – September 15, 1941) was an American businessman, farmer, and politician.

Background 
Riley was born in Gilmanton Township, Benton County, Minnesota. Riley lived with his wife and family in Foley, Minnesota, and was involved with farming and the cattle and horse business. Riley was also involved in the logging business. He served in the Minnesota House of Representatives in 1931 and 1932 and in 1941. He died while still in office.

References

1874 births
1941 deaths
People from Benton County, Minnesota
Businesspeople from Minnesota
Farmers from Minnesota
Members of the Minnesota House of Representatives